The Ascension wrasse (Thalassoma ascensionis) is a species of wrasse native to the eastern Atlantic Ocean, where it is known from St. Helena, Ascension Island, and São Tomé. It can reach  in standard length. It is one of several fishes commonly called greenfish.

References

Ascension wrasse
Fauna of Ascension Island
Ascension wrasse
Taxonomy articles created by Polbot